The Benjamin Jenkins House is a historic house in Andover, Massachusetts.  It was built in about 1807 for Colonel Benjamin Jenkins on family-owned land.  The substantial and elegant Federal style house was a stop on the road between Salem and Andover, and remained in the family into the 20th century.  One of its owners, William S. Jenkins, was a local builder of note in the second half of the 19th century, built the large ell of the house in 1849. In 1982, the house was added to the National Register of Historic Places.

See also
National Register of Historic Places listings in Andover, Massachusetts
National Register of Historic Places listings in Essex County, Massachusetts

References

Houses in Andover, Massachusetts
National Register of Historic Places in Andover, Massachusetts
Houses on the National Register of Historic Places in Essex County, Massachusetts
1807 establishments in Massachusetts